Allandale is an unihabited settlement on the island of Saint Croix in the United States Virgin Islands.

Variant names for this place include Bog of Allen, Allendale, and August Pentheny's Plantage.

References

Populated places in Saint Croix, U.S. Virgin Islands